Sweet Revenge is the second studio album by French singer Amanda Lear, released in 1978 by West German label Ariola Records. The album turned out a major commercial success, spawning European hit disco singles "Follow Me" and "Enigma (Give a Bit of Mmh to Me)". Sweet Revenge remains Lear's best-selling album. It was released in CD format in 1992.

Background
After the major success of the debut album, Lear teamed up again with Anthony Monn to work on her second LP. Sweet Revenge was recorded between December 1977 and February 1978 between various studios in Munich, and consisted of mainstream disco material, with all lyrics written by Lear. The album incorporates elements of cabaret music in "Comics" and rock in "The Stud". All songs from the side A of the original LP release are a lyrically linked non-stop medley, making Sweet Revenge a concept album. The songs tell the story of "a girl who sold her soul to the Devil and won", as Amanda explained in the liner notes. The girl surrenders to the Devil's temptation, who promises her fame and fortune, but eventually runs away and finds real love with a man, which is her "sweet revenge over the Devil's offer". In a 1997 interview, Lear considered Sweet Revenge the album she is the most proud of.

The album's gatefold cover was designed by Amanda Lear. The pictures, taken by Denis Taranto, reference sadomasochism and present Amanda as a dominatrix, holding a whip. Other images depict Lear channeling Marlene Dietrich, sitting on a barrel, wearing stockings and a top hat, what refers to the image of Dietrich in her iconic 1930 film The Blue Angel. Included are also two pictures of Amanda performing in concert as well as a topless photograph from her Playboy shoot. The album came with a big poster of the front cover image, with lyrics printed on the back.

"Follow Me" was released as the lead single and went on to become a Top 10 hit in many European countries, including No. 3 in Belgium, Germany and the Netherlands. The song now remains Lear's signature tune. "Enigma (Give a Bit of Mmh to Me)" was also met with a commercial success, reaching the Top 10 in certain territories, and "Gold" became a minor hit in Belgium. "Run Baby Run" received a single release, but did not match the chart success of other singles from the album. The 1977 hit single "Queen of Chinatown", previously available on Lear's debut album, was released as a bonus track on Italian editions of Sweet Revenge. In Spain, a cassette version of the album was released as Dulce Venganza (Sweet Revenge).

Sweet Revenge was accompanied by a concert tour, which was bigger and more elaborate than her previous shows. A promotional tournée was also launched in the United States, however, to no success. The publicity campaign again focused around Amanda's scandalous sex symbol image. The album was met with a commercial success, placing in the Top 10 in several European charts, including No. 4 in Germany, her most successful market at that time. It was certified gold in Germany and France, for selling 250,000 and 100,000 copies respectively. It is also her best-selling album to date, with an estimated 4 million copies shifted around the world.

The rights to the Ariola-Eurodisc back catalogue are currently held by Sony BMG Music Entertainment. Sweet Revenge was re-released on CD in 1992, excluding much of the visual content of the original double cover and syncing all songs from the side A into one CD track. For two decades, Sweet Revenge remained the only original Ariola album by Amanda Lear to have been re-released on compact disc worldwide, until her debut LP, I Am a Photograph, received a CD re-release in 2012 and 2013.

Track listings

Original LP release
Side A
 "Follow Me" (Anthony Monn, Amanda Lear) – 3:50
 "Gold" (Charly Ricanek, Amanda Lear) – 3:45
 "Mother, Look What They've Done to Me" (Anthony Monn, Amanda Lear) – 4:32
 "Run Baby Run" (Anthony Monn, Amanda Lear) – 3:45
 "Follow Me (Reprise)" (Anthony Monn, Amanda Lear) – 3:40

Side B
 "Comics" (Charly Ricanek, Amanda Lear) – 3:40
 "Enigma (Give a Bit of Mmh to Me)" (Rainer Pietsch, Amanda Lear) – 5:08
 "The Stud" (Rainer Pietsch, Amanda Lear) – 4:02
 "Hollywood Flashback" (Anthony Monn, Amanda Lear) – 4:31

Italian edition
Side A
 "Follow Me" (Anthony Monn, Amanda Lear) – 3:50
 "Gold" (Charly Ricanek, Amanda Lear) – 3:45
 "Mother, Look What They've Done to Me" (Anthony Monn, Amanda Lear) – 4:32
 "Run Baby Run" (Anthony Monn, Amanda Lear) – 3:45
 "Follow Me (Reprise)" (Anthony Monn, Amanda Lear) – 3:40

Side B
 "Comics" (Charly Ricanek, Amanda Lear) – 3:40
 "Enigma (Give a Bit of Mmh to Me)" (Rainer Pietsch, Amanda Lear) – 5:08
 "The Stud" (Rainer Pietsch, Amanda Lear) – 4:02
 "Hollywood Flashback" (Anthony Monn, Amanda Lear) – 4:31
 "Queen of Chinatown" (Rainer Pietsch, Amanda Lear) – 4:15

Spanish cassette edition
Side A
 "Sigueme (Follow Me)" (Anthony Monn, Amanda Lear)
 "Gold" (Charly Ricanek, Amanda Lear)
 "Mother, Look What They've Done to Me" (Anthony Monn, Amanda Lear)
 "Run Baby Run" (Anthony Monn, Amanda Lear)
 "Follow Me (Reprise)" (Anthony Monn, Amanda Lear)

Side B
 "Comics" (Charly Ricanek, Amanda Lear)
 "Enigma (Give a Bit of Mmh to Me)" (Rainer Pietsch, Amanda Lear)
 "The Stud" (Rainer Pietsch, Amanda Lear)
 "Hollywood Flashback" (Anthony Monn, Amanda Lear)
 "Comics (Reprise)" (Charly Ricanek, Amanda Lear)

CD edition
 "Follow Me"/"Gold"/"Mother, Look What They've Done to Me"/"Run Baby Run"/"Follow Me (Reprise)" (Anthony Monn, Charly Ricanek, Amanda Lear) – 19:44
 "Comics" (Charly Ricanek, Amanda Lear) – 3:40
 "Enigma (Give a Bit of Mmh to Me)" (Rainer Pietsch, Amanda Lear) – 5:08
 "The Stud" (Rainer Pietsch, Amanda Lear) – 4:02
 "Hollywood Flashback" (Anthony Monn, Amanda Lear) – 4:33

Personnel
 Amanda Lear – lead vocals
 Mats Björklund – guitar
 Wolfgang Emperhoff – backing vocals
 Martin Harrison – drums
 Herbert Ihle – backing vocals
 Dave King – bass guitar
 Peter Lüdemann – engineer
 Renate Mauerer – backing vocals
 Anthony Monn – record producer, programming
 Rainer Pietsch – arranger
 Edith Prock – backing vocals
 Charly Ricanek – arranger, keyboards
 Kristian Schultze – synthesizer
 Claudia Schwarz – backing vocals
 Denis Taranto – photography
 Gary Unwin – bass guitar

Chart performance

Weekly charts

Year-end charts

Certifications and sales

Release history

References

External links
 Sweet Revenge at Discogs
 Sweet Revenge at Rate Your Music

1978 albums
Amanda Lear albums
Concept albums